Kamaljeet Kumar (born 22 March 1988) is an Indian football player. He is currently playing for Mumbai in the I-League as a defender.

External links 
 Profile at Goal.com
 

Indian footballers
1988 births
Living people
People from Jammu district
Footballers from Jammu and Kashmir
Mumbai FC players
Pune FC players
I-League players
Association football defenders